FT PGB is an abbreviation for a family of Chinese built precision guided munitions named To-Fly Precision Guided Bomb (Fei-Teng Jing-Que Zhi-Dao Zha-Dan, 飞腾精确制导炸弹), developed by China Academy of Launch Vehicle Technology (CALT), a subsidiary of China Aerospace Science and Technology Corporation (CASC).

The FT PGB is actually an upgrade kit to modernize gravity bombs with precision guidance.  The kit consists of two modules, the inertial guidance module and the satellite guidance module.  The primary guidance system is the satellite guidance module, a technology reportedly to be reverse engineered from unexploded Joint Direct Attack Munition (JDAM) ordnance in the NATO bombing of the People's Republic of China embassy in Belgrade, according to many Chinese military enthusiasts.  A variety of satellite guidance can be used, such as GPS and GLONASS, as well as the Chinese Beidou navigation system, which will be usable in the Asia-Pacific region in 2012.  When satellite guidance is not available, the inertial guidance system is used, though the two systems are generally used together, complementing each other.

Chinese media have shown photographs of FT PGB being dropped from helicopters such as the Chinese Naval Ka-28, in addition to fixed winged platforms.  FT series PGB is also used as a component for a subfamily of another Chinese PGM, LS PGB, a family of gliding precision guided bombs.  FT series PGB was first revealed to public at the 7th Zhuhai Airshow held in November 2006 with two models of the family FT-1 and FT-3, and the family of this weapon is built to Chinese GJV289A standard, the Chinese equivalent of MIL-STD-1553B.  The adaptation of such a military standard means that the weapon can be readily deployed on any western platforms.

There are 10 bombs in the FT family:
 FT-1: satellite guided 500 kg / 1000 lb bombs
 FT-2: satellite guided 500 kg / 1000 lb glide bombs
 FT-3: satellite guided 250 kg / 500 lb bombs
 FT-4: satellite guided 250 kg / 500 lb bombs with planar wing kit
 FT-5: small diameter 100 kg bombs
 FT-6: satellited guided 250 kg / 500 lb bombs with planar wing kit
 FT-7: small 130 kg bomb with planar wing
 FT-8: small air-to-surface missile, 20 kg, range 8.85km for C variant, 8 kg, range 4.5km for D variant
 FT-9: small 50 kg bomb
 FT-10: small 25 kg air-to-surface missile
 FT-12: large 500 kg glide bomb unit. A rocket booster can be attached to extend its range to 150 km, provided a release velocity of 600–1000 km/h.
 : At the 9th Zhuhai Airshow held in November 2012, it was revealed that a family of satellite guided bombs (SGB)  utilizing FT PGB upgrade kit was designated as Tiangang (or Tian Gang, 天罡 in Chinese, which is the ancient Chinese name for Pole star).  Produced by the subsidiary of Norinco, the Harbin Jiancheng Group (哈尔滨建成集团有限公司), Polar star 500 was shown to the public at the airshow, named after 500 kg gravity bomb used.  However, the developer confirmed that gravity bombs of other different sizes are available upon customer's requests.  The marketing of Pole star series SGBs suggests that the FT PGB upgrade conversion kit, as well as the bombs armed with such conversion upgrade kits, the Pole star series, are both available for export.  
 Pole star series SGB have rather unusual Pinyin abbreviation as TD, because when its Chinese name, Tian Gang is Romanized, the abbreviation is TG, which is the same as the abbreviation of another Chinese precision guided bomb (PGB), Tian Ge (or Tiange, 天戈 in Chinese, the ancient Chinese name for Boötes), which is a laser guided PGB developed by the same company reveal at the same airshow. Since the Pinyin abbreviation TG is already taken by Boötes (Tian Ge) series PGB, Pole star (Tian Gang) series PGB is named as TD series instead.  The ER suffix is the English abbreviation for Extended Range, because the bomb also incorporates the gliding components of LS PGB to increase its range so that it can be launched further away from targets.

Operators
: People's Liberation Army
People's Liberation Army Air Force
People's Liberation Army Navy Air Force
: Royal Saudi Land Forces
Royal Saudi Air Force
: Pakistan Armed Forces
Pakistan Air Force

References

External links
 Fei-teng PGB

Weapons of the People's Republic of China
Guided bombs
Military equipment introduced in the 2000s